The 1935 San Diego mayoral election was held on April 23, 1935, to elect the mayor for San Diego. Two mayors had resigned since the previous mayoral election, and no incumbent mayor stood for reelection. In the primary election, Percy J. Benbough and A. Ray Sauer Jr. received the most votes and advanced to a runoff election. Benbough was then elected mayor with a majority of the votes in the runoff.

Candidates
Percy J. Benbough, mortician and mayoral candidate in 1927
A. Ray Sauer Jr.
Harry Steinmetz, San Diego State College teacher
William E. Harper
Henry B. Cramer
Le Roy E. Goodbody
Daniel M. Denton
C. Leon De Aryan
Rufus S. Hendon

Campaign
Previously elected mayor John F. Forward Jr. had resigned mid-term and did not contest the 1935 election. His appointed replacement, Rutherford B. Irones had also resigned prior to the election and did not contest it. Vice Mayor Albert W. Bennett served as acting mayor during the campaign. Bennett did not contest the election. 

Several civic leaders who called themselves the Civic Affairs Conference endorsed a slate of candidates for the 1935 mayoral and city council elections. The convention endorsed local businessman Percy J. Benbough as their candidate for mayor. Another challenger was Harry C. Steinmetz, a teacher at San Diego State College who ran a socialistic campaign endorsing full public ownership of all utilities.

On March 26, 1935, Benbough came in first in the primary election with 34.6 percent of the votes, followed by A. Ray Sauer Jr., son of the publisher of a weekly newspaper, in second place with 20.5 percent. Steinmetz finished third with 12.4 percent of the vote, and was eliminated from the runoff. Since no candidate received a majority of the vote, Benbough and Sauer advanced to a runoff election. On April 23, 1935, Benbough came in first place in the runoff election with 54.3 percent of the vote and was elected to the office of the mayor.

Primary election results

General election results

References

1935
1935 in California
1935 United States mayoral elections
1935
April 1935 events